Florentino Torres y Santos (October 16, 1844 – April 29, 1927) was as an Associate Justice of the Supreme Court of the Philippines. Prior to his appointment as an Associate Justice, he was the first Filipino to be appointed as attorney-general. He had also served as a prosecuting attorney, a prosecutor and as a judge.

Early life
Torres was born on October 16, 1844 from a poor family in Santa Cruz, Manila. His father died in a ship mishap when he was still young; his mother, Luciana Santos–Torres, died during the cholera epidemic of 1882.

Education and career
Torrest obtained his Bachelor of Philosophy in Colegio de San Juan de Letran. He obtained his Bachelor of Canon Law and Bachelor of Civil Law at the University of Santo Tomas in 1866 and 1868, respectively.

Marriage
Torres was married to Sabina Vergara with whom he had six children: Manuel, a prominent lawyer; Luis, former Justice of the Supreme Court; Antonio, a councilor and a former Chief of Police of Manila, Pilar, Alejandra and Rosita.

Career
He was admitted to the bar in 1871 and was immediately appointed as the prosecuting fiscal of the Court of First Instance in the judicial district of Binondo, Manila. He had also served concurrently as the fiscal and the Secretary of the Relator de La Audiencia de Manila in the same judicial district from 1873 to 1879.

He was named as fiscal of the province of Matanzas, Cuba but he decided to decline the position. He was appointed judge of the Court of First Instance of Ilocos Sur in 1888; he was later transferred to Pampanga in 1890. In 1892, he served as Teniente Fiscal de la Audiencia Territorial de Cebu and later as magistrate of the 'Audiencia de la Criminal de Cebu.

Torres was a sympathizer of the American civil government. Due to this, he was appointed as Attorney-General, the first Filipino to occupy such office. On June 17, 1901, he was appointed as an associate justice of the newly established Supreme Court of the Philippines by U.S. President William Mckinley. He held such position until his resignation on April 22, 1920. He resigned believing that he was bypassed, being the most senior, after Mapa succeeded Arellano as Chief Justice.

Political career
Emilio Aguinaldo designated Torres to meet with American authorities for amicable adjustment of political interest of Filipino and American parties. However, the meeting did not achieve tangible results, but he was able to influence the Aguinaldo government from making more hostile acts against the occupying Americans. Torres joined the Pacificos, a group who believed that independence could not be achieve through force. Later on, he became a member of a new political party called Partido Federal'' that aimed at the annexation of the Philippines as an American state.

Death
Torres died of paralysis in Manila on April 29, 1927.

Legacy 
Florentino Torres High School in Tondo, Manila was renamed after Torres in 1930.

References

1844 births
1927 deaths
Associate Justices of the Supreme Court of the Philippines
19th-century Filipino judges
People from Santa Cruz, Manila
University of Santo Tomas alumni
Colegio de San Juan de Letran alumni
20th-century Filipino judges